Wevie Stonder 
are a British group formed in Brighton in 1993. They have released 6 studio albums on Skam, Sonig and Cack Records.

History
Wevie Stonder first began making music in 1979 at the age of 6, by recording some chickens down an old army telephone onto a cassette recorder, accompanied by a 3 stringed acoustic guitar.

They regrouped in 1993 with an Amstrad Studio 100 4 track, Casio PT 82 and an electric bass to record a failed cover version of "I Just Called To Say I love You" and various other audio experiments, which were inserted into Brighton Music Library on side B of a Steve Reich cassette, complete with its own Dewey Decimal Number.

Their debut LP Eat Your Own Ears (whose name was later taken by the London-based promotions company) led them to release a series of records on the Skam and Sonig labels and perform at electronic music nights and festivals around the UK and Europe, creating some confusion in the electronic music world and a fad for spoonerised names.

Wevie Stonder have played over 70 European live shows and recorded sessions for BBC Radio 1 & 3, and continue to work on new music and art in many different guises.

Discography
On Skam Records

Eat Your Own Ears (2000)
Drawing on Other People's Heads (2002)
Stoat (2002)
Kenyan Harry   EP (2003)
The Wooden Horse of Troy (2005)

On Sonig (as Wevie De Crepon)

The Age Old Age Of Old Age Mini LP  (2003)
Ton Wah 12 (2004)

On CACK Records

The Bucket (2009)
Small People / Shut the Gate (2009)
The Beast Of Wevie (2017)

Remixes:

The man with the Xylophone skull (2001) for Rubin Steiner
King Holer (2002) for Fujiya & Miyagi
Pushchairs for grown ups (2004) for Team Doyobi
A buddha made of mud (2007) for Schlammpeitziger

Radio Sessions:

BBC Radio 3 - "Mixing it" hosted by Robert Sandall and Mark Russell, broadcast 2/6/06

BBC Radio 1 - "Breezeblock" Mary Anne Hobbs, broadcast 3/9/05

References

External links
 Official website
 Ton Wah

British electronic music groups